The 1981 Wildwater Canoeing World Championships was the 12th edition of the global wildwater canoeing competition, Wildwater Canoeing World Championships, organised by the International Canoe Federation.

Results

K1

Men

Men team

Women

Women team

C1

Men

Men team

C2

Men

Men team

Mixed

Medal table

See also
 Wildwater canoeing

References

External links
 

Wildwater Canoeing World Championships